Taman Hutan Raya Ir. H. Juanda (lt. Grand Forest Park of (engineer) H. Juanda) is a conservation area and botanical garden in Bandung, Indonesia. It covers 590 hectares, stretching from Dago Pakar to Maribaya.

The park takes its name after Djuanda Kartawidjaja, the last Prime Minister of Indonesia. It is located in Kampung Pakar, Ciburial Village, in the Cimenyan District. Its altitude ranges between 770 and 1330 meters above sea level. Its fertile soil sustains about 2500 types of plants, consisting of 40 familia and 112 species. In 1965 the park was established with an extent of around 10 ha, but this has expanded to 590 hectares stretching from Dago Pakar to Maribaya. It is currently managed by the Forestry Service of West Java Provincial Government (previously under the auspices of Perum Perhutani).

References 

 https://web.archive.org/web/20130120094046/http://tahuradjuanda.jabarprov.go.id/index.php/subMenu/593
 https://web.archive.org/web/20110811083710/http://www.dephut.go.id/informasi/twa/tahura/juanda.htm
 http://ciburial.desa.id/desa-wisata-ciburial/

External links 
 Points of interest in the area of Tahura Ir. H. Juanda

Bandung
Botanical gardens in Indonesia